Vovovo FC is a Liswati football club based in Piggs Peak which currently plays in the National First Division, the second-tier competition in the country. The team plays its home matches at the 1,500-capacity Killarney Sports Field.

History
Vovovo FC played in the Premier League of Eswatini through the 2018–19 season, following which the team was relegated to the National First Division.

References

External links
Official Facebook
Soccerway profile
Global Sports Archive profile

Football clubs in Eswatini